Lidell Creek is a small creek in the town of Exeter in Otsego County, New York. Lidell Creek flows into Oaks Creek by Lidell Corners, south of the Hamlet of Schuyler Lake.

References

Rivers of New York (state)
Rivers of Otsego County, New York